Pismire can refer to:

 Pismire Island in Lake Michigan
 Archaic term for an ant
 The Emmet (or ant) in heraldry